Lotus hirsutus, also known by the synonym Dorycnium hirsutum, common name: canary clover or hairy canary-clover, is a species of flowering plant in the legume family Fabaceae.

Description
It is a low-growing, domed semi-evergreen subshrub, reaching on average  in height. Its habit is erect, green, hairy and branched. The silver leaves are sessile, alternate and quite fuzzy. The flowers are white veined pinkish-red, in terminal umbels composed of four to ten flowers. The flowering period extends from May through July. The fruits are cylindrical reddish brown seed pods.

Distribution
This plant is native to the Mediterranean Basin, from Portugal to Turkey and south to northern Africa.

Habitat
The typical habitat of this sub-shrub is grassland, in well-drained soil.

Cultivation
This plant is found in cultivation. In the United Kingdom it has won the Royal Horticultural Society's Award of Garden Merit.

Gallery

References

 Pignatti S. - Flora d'Italia - Edagricole – 1982. vol. III
 Tutin, T. G., eds. 1964 -1980 - Flora europaea

External links

 Biolib
 Dorycnium hirsutum
 Dorycnium hirsutum
 Wild flowers

hirsutus
Flora of Europe
Flora of North Africa
Flora of Western Asia
Taxa named by Carl Linnaeus